The 1910–11 Northern Football League season was the 22nd in the history of the Northern Football League, a football competition in Northern England.

Clubs

The league featured 9 clubs which competed in the last season, along with three new clubs: 
 Eston United
 Leadgate Park
 Stanley United

League table

References

1910-11
1910–11 in English association football leagues